Phylecia Armstrong (born ) is a retired Trinidad and Tobago female volleyball player. 
She was part of the Trinidad and Tobago women's national volleyball team. 

She participated at the 2011 Women's Pan-American Volleyball Cup.

References

External links

1984 births
Living people
Trinidad and Tobago women's volleyball players
Place of birth missing (living people)
Beach volleyball players at the 2022 Commonwealth Games